West Michigan Aviation Academy (WMAA) is a charter high school in Grand Rapids, Michigan (U.S.). Students have the option of completing flight training and obtaining a private pilot licence. US News and World Report ranks the school the 26th best in Michigan.

History
In 2010, pilot and billionaire Dick DeVos established WMAA on the suggestion of his wife, Betsy DeVos. The academy is a tuition-free public charter high school. The initial enrollment of 80 students assembled for the Fall term of 2010 in a  renovated office facility located on the grounds of the Gerald R. Ford International Airport.

They quickly realized that more space would be needed and it wasn't long before expansion plans were on the drafting board. On the first day of the 2012–13 school year, more than 240 Freshmen, Sophomores, and Juniors found their high school home had expanded with a new 42,500 sq. ft. addition. This new addition enabled not only expansion in space, but also in curriculum, student life, and aviation programs. The new building gave the academy the capacity to educate 500 students.

In 2014, the school administration expected to have a population of 500 for the upcoming fall semester.

Due to high demand for attendance, the school operates on a lottery system to admit students.

See also
 List of public school academy districts in Michigan

References

External links
 

Charter high schools in Michigan
Education in Grand Rapids, Michigan
Schools in Kent County, Michigan
Aviation schools
Aviation schools in the United States
2010 establishments in Michigan